Sea of Souls is a BBC paranormal drama series, recounting the fictional activities of a group of investigators into psychic and other paranormal events. Produced in-house by BBC Scotland and for the final season by Carnival Films, initially in association with Sony Pictures Television International, the series debuted on BBC One in the UK in February 2004. A second series was shown from January 2005, with a third following in 2006 and then a fourth in April 2007.

The programme was created by writer David Kane, who also wrote the entire first series. The final series, unlike the previous series, was an independent production for BBC Scotland by Carnival Films.

Overview
The central character is Douglas Monaghan, played by Bill Paterson, who is the head of a parapsychology unit at a fictional university in Glasgow, Scotland. In the first series he is assisted by Megan Sharma (Archie Panjabi) and Andrew Gemmill (Peter McDonald), but these characters were replaced – without any on-screen explanation – in the second series by Justine McManus (Dawn Steele) and Craig Stevenson (Iain Robertson).

The series has seen the team encounter phenomena such as ghosts, reincarnation and voodooism. Each series has consisted of six one-hour episodes, initially comprising three two-part story lines. The first series was shown on consecutive Monday and Tuesday nights, but for series two the transmission days switched to Saturday and Sunday. Other changes introduced in the second series included the introduction of sub-plots to help with the pacing of each storyline, and more Scottish-focused story lines, the first series having been criticised for the characters' frequent trips to London.

The third series was broadcast from 7 January – 11 February 2006, each episode airing in a 9.10pm-10.10pm slot. For this third run the format had been changed with the series now consisting of six individual one-episode stories instead of three two-parters, with the episodes being shown once per week on Saturday nights. Executive producer and BBC Scotland Head of Drama Barbara McKissack explained the change in format as being "a much better, faster paced format for this kind of show."

Prominent guest stars in individual story lines have included Peter Capaldi, Siobhan Redmond, James Fleet, John Guerrasio, Paul McGann, John Hannah, Jeff Rawle and Colin Salmon. The first two series have been released on DVD in the UK. The programme has also been shown overseas, including in Australia on the Australian Broadcasting Corporation, which showed the first series from September 2005, with series two being shown on Sci Fi in January 2007. It has also been broadcast to South America by HBO Latin America in 2006. The series has been sold to over forty countries as of December 2005.

Production
The first series was produced by Phil Collinson, but after he left to produce the revival of Doctor Who, Stephen Garwood took over as producer for the second and third series.

Awards
At the BAFTA Scotland Awards, held on 13 November 2005 at the Radisson SAS Hotel, Sea of Souls Series 2 won an award for Best Drama, beating Taggart and Monarch of the Glen.

Cast
Douglas Monaghan – Bill Paterson
Is the main character over all and has featured in all series so far, though he featured much more predominantly in series one and two.
He is dependable and compassionate, and has changed throughout the run of the series. At the beginning Douglas was a sceptic, almost refusing to believe and denying anything paranormal. But as of series three he has become more open to the suggestion that not everything can be easily explained by science.

Justine McManus – Dawn Steele
After arriving in series two she struggled to gain the respect of co-workers, but one year on is much more self-assured and is enjoying her new-found friendship with Craig. She is a single mother of her 10-year-old son Billy. We have not been introduced to his father, yet he does often look after Billy. She is empathic and considerate and has a knack with people. Right from the beginning it is clear that Justine has several paranormal abilities, she can apparently see the future (which featured in series three episode Oracle), sense things and see the dead. But none of these have been properly looked into as Justine is unsure of finding out the true nature of them. In series three her abilities are shown to be much more powerful than she could ever have imagined, especially when it seems she has passed them on to her son Billy.

Craig Stevenson – Iain Robertson
Also arrived in series two, Craig is often insensitive and arrogant towards people who seek the department's help, it's clear he's not a people person and he is quick to rush into things. In series three, a new friendship with Justine seems to have done him good. He also loses some of his know-it-all side. Craig's new friendship with Justine also leads to him discover her hidden psychic skills, and it's a revelation that has far-reaching implications for him. In the third series his own beliefs are put to the test, causing him to reconsider his mindset towards the paranormal.

Locations
 The fictional "Clyde University" in the series is in real life Glasgow's University of Strathclyde, whose campus is a principal filming location, particularly during the second and third series.
 The home of the parapsychology department – the "Murray Thompson Building" – is the real-life James Weir Building, the home of the University of Strathclyde's mechanical engineering department, and is used extensively for interior and exterior shots in the series.
 Some scenes were shot in Edinburgh.

Episode list

Series 1 (2004)
Even though they only appear in this series, Monaghan's two assistants, Megan Sharma and Andrew Gemmil, are not formally written out in the concluding story. Phil Collinson produced this series only, moving immediately thereafter to Doctor Who.

Series 2 (2005)

Series 3 (2006)
This series offered a change to the format. Instead of three, two-part mysteries, aired over the course of three weeks, this series offered a more traditional six-week episodic format. As with the first series, however, the student assistants made their final appearances in the concluding story without their departures being explained.

Series 4 (2007)
This series features Monaghan without any student assistants. Music for this series was provided by Sheridan Tongue, and was his sole contribution to Sea of Souls.

References

External links
 
 

British supernatural television shows
2004 British television series debuts
2007 British television series endings
2000s British drama television series
BBC television dramas
BBC Scotland television shows
Edgar Award-winning works
Films shot in Edinburgh
English-language television shows
Television shows set in Glasgow
British fantasy television series
2000s British horror television series
Television series by Sony Pictures Television